The 2000 British Formula Three season was the 50th British Formula Three Championship season. It commenced on 26 March at Thruxton, and ended on 8 October at Silverstone after fourteenth races.

Brazilian driver Antônio Pizzonia won the title after winning five races and achieved a total of eleven podiums during the season. These results allowed Pizzonia to finish 39 points ahead of Stewart Racing's Tomas Scheckter, who beat Carlin Motorsport's driver Takuma Sato by 32 points.

Drivers and teams
The following teams and drivers were competitors in the 2000 season. The Scholarship class was for older Formula Three cars, and all cars competed on Avon tyres.

Results

Standings

References

External links
 
 The official website of the British Formula 3 Championship

British Formula Three Championship seasons
Formula Three season
British
British Formula 3